Bhopal Dakshin-Pashchim Assembly constituency is one of the 230 constituencies of Madhya Pradesh Legislative Assembly. It is an assembly segment of Bhopal Lok Sabha constituency. Prior to 2008, it was known as Bhopal South.

Members of the Legislative Assembly

^by poll

References
 http://myneta.info/2008mp/candidate.php?candidate_id=63
 http://www.empoweringindia.org/new/constituency.aspx?eid=956&cid=152

Assembly constituencies of Madhya Pradesh
Bhopal district